Khanda Museum is a museum located at Fatehgarh Sahib and its building constructed in shape of Sikh religious symbol Khanda. The museum is built by SGPC in the memory of Sikh-warrior Banda Singh Bahadur and would exhibit his history. The museum is located near Gurdwara Fatehgarh Sahib. The museum opened on 7 January 2018.

See also 
 Fateh Burj
 Battle of Chappar Chiri
 Rauza Sharif

References

External links 
 Google Maps Location

Fatehgarh Sahib
Monuments and memorials in Punjab, India
Sikh architecture
History museums in India
History of Punjab